The following elections occurred in the year 1994.

Africa
 1994 Botswana general election
 1994 Guinea-Bissau general election
 1994 Malawian general election
 1994 Mozambican general election
 1994 Namibian general election
 1994 South African general election
 1994 São Tomé and Príncipe legislative election
 1994 Togolese parliamentary election
 1994 Ugandan Constituent Assembly election

Asia
 1994 Kazakhstani legislative election
 1994 Nepalese legislative election
 1994 Sri Lankan parliamentary election
 1994 Turkish local elections

Malaysia
 1994 Sabah state election

Turkey
 1994 Turkish local elections

Australia
 1994 Bonython by-election
 1994 Elizabeth state by-election
 1994 Fremantle by-election
 1994 Mackellar by-election
 1994 Northern Territory general election
 1994 Taylor state by-election
 1994 Torrens state by-election
 1994 Warringah by-election
 1994 Werriwa by-election

Europe
 1994 Basque parliamentary election
 1994 Belarusian presidential election
 1994 Bulgarian parliamentary election
 1994 Crimean presidential election
 1994 Danish parliamentary election
 1994 Dutch general election
 1994 European Parliament election
 1994 Faroese parliamentary election
 1994 Fianna Fáil leadership election
 1994 Finnish presidential election
 1994 Hungarian parliamentary election
 1994 Italian general election
 1994 Norwegian European Union membership referendum
 1994 Slovak parliamentary election
 1994 Stockholm municipal election
 1994 Swedish general election
 1994 Turkish local elections
 1994 Ukrainian parliamentary election
 1994 Ukrainian presidential election
 1994 Austrian legislative election
 1994 German federal election

European Parliament
 1994 European Parliament election
 1994 European Parliament election in Belgium
 1994 European Parliament election in Denmark
 1994 European Parliament election in Portugal
 1994 European Parliament election in the United Kingdom
 1994 European Parliament election in France
 1994 European Parliament election in Germany
 1994 European Parliament election in Greece
 1994 European Parliament election in Ireland
 1994 European Parliament election in Italy
 1994 European Parliament election in Luxembourg
 1994 European Parliament election in the Netherlands
 1994 European Parliament election in Spain
 1994 European Parliament election in Germany
 1994 European Parliament election in Spain

France
 1994 European Parliament election in France
 1994 French cantonal elections

Moldova
 1994 Moldovan parliamentary election
 1994 Moldovan referendum

United Kingdom
 1994 Barking by-election
 1994 Bradford South by-election
 1994 Dagenham by-election
 1994 Dudley West by-election
 1994 Eastleigh by-election
 1994 European Parliament election in the United Kingdom
 Richard Huggett
 1994 Labour Party leadership election
 1994 Scottish regional elections
 1994 Monklands East by-election
 1994 Newham North East by-election
 1994 Rotherham by-election

United Kingdom local
 1994 United Kingdom local elections

English local
 1994 Bristol City Council elections
 1994 Lambeth Council election
 1994 Lewisham Council election
 1994 Manchester Council election
 1994 Newham Council election
 1994 Southwark Council election
 1994 Tower Hamlets Council election
 1994 Trafford Council election
 1994 Wolverhampton Council election

North America
 1993–1994 Belizean municipal elections

Canada
 1994 Brantford municipal election
 1994 Edmonton municipal by-election
 1994 Ottawa municipal election
 1994 Quebec general election
 1994 Quebec municipal elections
 1994 Toronto municipal election

Caribbean
 1994 Antigua and Barbuda general election
 1994 Barbadian general election

Mexico
 1994 Mexican general election

United States
 1994 United States Senate elections
 1994 United States House of Representatives elections
 1994 United States elections
 1994 United States gubernatorial elections

United States mayoral
 1994 New Orleans mayoral election
 1994 Washington, D.C. mayoral election

California
 1994 California State Assembly elections
 1994 California Attorney General election
 1994 California Insurance Commissioner election
 1994 California Secretary of State election
 1994 California State Controller election
 1994 California state elections
 1994 California State Treasurer election
 1994 California Superintendent of Public Instruction election
 1994 California Courts of Appeal elections
 1994 California State Senate elections
 United States House of Representatives elections in California, 1994
 United States Senate election in California, 1994

Massachusetts
 1994 Massachusetts general election

Oklahoma
 1994 Oklahoma state elections

Oceania
 1994 Cook Islands general election
 1994 Fijian general election

Australia
 1994 Bonython by-election
 1994 Elizabeth state by-election
 1994 Fremantle by-election
 1994 Mackellar by-election
 1994 Northern Territory general election
 1994 Taylor state by-election
 1994 Torrens state by-election
 1994 Warringah by-election
 1994 Werriwa by-election

South America
 1994 Argentine Constitutional Assembly election
 1994 Brazilian general election
 1994 Colombian presidential election
 1994 Uruguayan general election

See also

 
1994
Elections